Chrysaora is a genus of jellyfish, commonly called the sea nettles, in the family Pelagiidae. The origin of the genus name Chrysaora lies in Greek mythology with Chrysaor, brother of Pegasus and son of Poseidon and Medusa. Translated, Chrysaor means "he who has a golden armament."

Species
There are 16 recognized species in the genus Chrysaora:
 Chrysaora achlyos  – black sea nettle
 Chrysaora africana 
 Chrysaora agulhensis 
 Chrysaora chesapeakei  - Atlantic bay nettle
 Chrysaora chinensis 
 Chrysaora colorata  – purple-striped jelly
 Chrysaora fulgida 
 Chrysaora fuscescens  – Pacific sea nettle
 Chrysaora helvola 
 Chrysaora hysoscella  – compass jellyfish
 Chrysaora lactea 
 Chrysaora melanaster  – northern sea nettle 
 Chrysaora pacifica  – Japanese sea nettle
 Chrysaora pentastoma 
 Chrysaora plocamia  – South American sea nettle
 Chrysaora quinquecirrha  – Atlantic sea nettle

Invalid species names
Chrysaora blossevillei Lesson 1830 [nomen dubium]
Chrysaora caliparea (Reynaud 1830) [species inquirenda]
Chrysaora depressa (Kishinouye 1902) [accepted as Chrysaora melanaster Brandt 1838]
Chrysaora kynthia Gershwin & Zeidler 2008 [nomen dubium]
Chrysaora southcotti Gershwin & Zeidler 2008 [accepted as Chrysaora pentastoma Péron & Lesueur, 1810]
Chrysaora wurlerra Gershwin & Zeidler 2008 [nomen dubium]

References

 
Cnidarian genera
Pelagiidae